The 2019 Idol Star Championships Chuseok Special was held at Goyang Gymnasium in Goyang was broadcast on MBC on September 12 and 13, 2019.

Cast

Presenters 
Jun Hyun-moo, Super Junior's Leeteuk and Dahyun (Twice).

Main 
Full 2019 ISAC Lunar New Year's line-up

Results

Men 

 Athletics

 Archery

 Ssireum

 Penalty Shoot-out

Women 

 Athletics

 Archery
Ssireum

 Pitching
Fastest Pitch : Yeji (Itzy)

Mixed 

 Esports

 Horseback riding

Ratings

References

External Links 
 Website

MBC TV original programming
South Korean variety television shows
South Korean game shows
2019 in South Korean television
Idol Star Athletics Championships